Namhkok (also known as Nankok) was a Shan state in what is today Burma.

References

19th century in Burma
Shan States